The Men's omnium event of the 2009 UCI Track Cycling World Championships was held on 29–30 March 2009.

Results

Overall classification

References

External links
 Full results at tissottiming.com

Men's omnium
UCI Track Cycling World Championships – Men's omnium